Klim (pronounced "climb"), based in Rigby, Idaho, is a company that manufactures motor sports (snowmobile and motorcycle) clothing using the same-name brand for men, women, and children.

Klim was purchased by Polaris Industries in 2012 and is now a wholly owned subsidiary.

References

External links 
 

Clothing companies of the United States
Companies based in Idaho
Sporting goods manufacturers of the United States